Mäkilä is a Finnish surname meaning "hill farm". Notable people with the surname include:

 Antti Mäkilä (born 1989), Finnish ice hockey player
 Jussi Mäkilä (born 1974), Finnish mountain bike orienteering competitor
 Mia Mäkilä (born 1973), Swedish artist
 Sasha Mäkilä (born 1973), Finnish conductor

See also

Finnish-language surnames